The London and North Eastern Railway (LNER) was a British railway company. During its operation, it also operated a number of ships.

Vessels operated

References

Sources
 

LNER
London and North Eastern Railway